Ricwin, Ricuin, Richwin, or Richovin (died 25 June 841) was the Count of Nantes from 831 to 841. A Rihwinus comes witnessed the will of Charlemagne in 811.

A fidelis of Louis the Pious, Ricwin was named count in the Nantais and the Breton March after the exile of Lambert I. In 832, with Rainier, Bishop of Vannes, he opposed the creation of Redon Abbey by Saint Conwoïon, supported by Nominoë. Ricwin died in the Battle of Fontenay-en-Puisaye fighting on the side of Charles the Bald.

References 

841 deaths
Medieval French nobility
9th-century French people
Year of birth unknown